Bryolymnia bicon is a moth of the family Noctuidae first described by Herbert Druce in 1889. It is found from Veracruz in central-eastern Mexico southward to Costa Rica.

External links

Hadeninae
Moths described in 1889